William Álvarez (15 December 1934 – 23 January 2022) was a Colombian-born Spanish tennis coach and former professional player. He relocated to Spain in the 1970s and became a world acclaimed coach.

Born in Medellín, Álvarez was an eight-time Colombian national champion and a member of the country's Davis Cup team, debuting in 1959. Álvarez, who is known by his nickname of Pato, made the third round of the 1961 French Championships. In 1963 he missed out on an opportunity to make another Roland Garros third round when he was defaulted during his second round match for arguing with the umpire, while a set up against Martin Mulligan. He died on 23 January 2022, at the age of 87.

References

External links
 
 
 

1934 births
2022 deaths
Colombian emigrants to Spain
Colombian male tennis players
Spanish tennis coaches
Sportspeople from Medellín